The 1992 Campeonato Ecuatoriano de Fútbol de la Serie A was the 34th season of the Serie A, the top level of professional football in Ecuador.

Teams
The number of teams for this season was played by 12 teams.

(In First Stage) 

(In Second Stage)

First stage

Second stage

Hexagonal 1

Hexagonal 2

Definición del Descenso

Liguilla Final
</onlyinclude>

Final

References

External links
 Línea de Tiempo de eventos y partidos de Liga Deportiva Universitaria
 Calendario de partidos históricos de Liga Deportiva Universitaria
 Sistema de Consulta Interactiva y Herramienta de consulta interactiva de partidos de Liga Deportiva Universitaria

1992
Ecu
 Football